The Inarajan Pillbox is a World War II-era defensive fortification near the mouth of Inarajan Bay in the United States territory of Guam. Set on a limestone outcrop on the south side of the bay, the fortification occupies a natural niche in the formation, with a wall of piled coral rocks and cement covering part of the opening. This fortification was built by Japanese soldiers occupying Guam between 1941 and 1944. The structure was listed on the National Register of Historic Places in 1991, as "Inalahan Pillbox".

References

Buildings and structures on the National Register of Historic Places in Guam
World War II on the National Register of Historic Places in Guam
1940s establishments in Guam
Inalåhan, Guam
Pillboxes (military)